The Königssee bobsleigh, luge, and skeleton track is a venue in Germany for bobsleigh, luge and skeleton, located in Schönau am Königssee,  Bavaria, near Königssee (German for "King's Lake") and the border with Austria. Completed  in 1968, it is the first permanent, artificially refrigerated bobsleigh, luge, and skeleton track in the world. In July 2021, the track was severely damaged by the floods that affected the European continent.

History
In 1967, Königssee hosted the European luge championships on a naturally refrigerated track. Later that year, it was decided to construct a permanent, reinforced concrete structure that was artificially refrigerated. The track, initially for luge, was completed in 1968. The first international competition took place the following year with the FIL World Luge Championships

On 3–4 December 1977, the track hosted the first Luge World Cup event won by Paul Hildgartner (Italy - men's singles), Andrea Fendt (West Germany - women's singles), and Italy's Peter Gschnitzer and Karl Brunner (men's doubles). Bobsleigh was added to the track in the 1970s in time for the track to host their sports' championship event in 1979, the first time any track would host both bobsleigh and luge in the same year in a non-Winter Olympic year (the track in Igls, Austria, was the first to do this at the 1976 Winter Olympics in Innsbruck).

Skeleton competitions began in the late 1970s, hosting the world championships in 1990. The track was part of Salzburg, Austria's unsuccessful bid for the 2014 Winter Olympics in 2007. In October 2008, it was announced that the track would undergo a renovation project from 2010 to 2016. Costing € 21.7 million to do, the track is being done in part of Munich's bid to host the 2018 Winter Olympics. Renovation includes extending the finish line and a new building near turn 16 and is scheduled to be complete by 2012. The starting area of the track will be started on 2014 and will finish on 2016. On 28 February 2009, it was announced the track would host the 2011 FIBT World Championships after the original winner, Cortina d'Ampezzo, withdrew to issues with the city and the track. The 29th and last Luge World Cup at the track prior to renovation took place on 2–3 January 2010. Bobsleigh and Skeleton had their last World Cup prior to renovation the following weekend.

Track renovation was done during the rest of 2010. At the end of March 2010, the Turbodrom Kreisel turn caught fire following some welding work and was badly damaged. Renovation of the refrigeration plant was carried out in December 2010 with ammonia being pumped in on the 18th. Olympic champion Felix Loch made the first run on the luge part of the track on the 23rd in time for the World Cup event on 5–6 January 2011. The renovation was also done for the 2011 FIBT World Championships that took place in late February.

In 2021, the track was severely damaged by the flooding across Europe. According to BSD (German Bobsleigh and Luge Association) President Thomas Schwab, it was take until October 2022 before the track will return to competition status. There was no ammonia refrigeration leak though to the piping being shut off to the end of the season.

Statistics

Turns 1, 4, 10, 11, 12, 14 and 15 have no names listed in the track diagram.

Championships hosted
FIBT World Championships: 1979, 1986, 1990 (men's skeleton), 2004 (all bobsleigh and skeleton events), 2011, 2017
FIL European Luge Championships: 1967 (As a natural track.), 1972, 1973, 1977, 1988, 1994, 2017
FIL World Luge Championships: 1969, 1970, 1974, 1979, 1999, 2016, 2021

References

External links 
 BSD profile 
 FIBT track profile - Click on video link for track. To left is where bobsleigh intersects with men's single luge part of track, then followed right after with luge - women's singles, luge - women's doubles, and skeleton parts of the track.
 FIL-Luge.org track profile
 Official website 
 Youtube.com profile of American luger Brian Martin from the men's singles luge start house.

Bobsleigh, luge, and skeleton tracks in Germany
Sports venues in Bavaria
Buildings and structures in Berchtesgadener Land